X. Fliegerkorps (10th Air Corps) was a formation  of the German Luftwaffe in World War II, which specialised in coastal operations. It was formed 2 October 1939, in Hamburg from the 10. Flieger-Division.

Operational history
Generalleutnant Hans Ferdinand Geisler was put in command of the newly formed Flieger-Division on 3 September 1939, based at Blankenese. Initially its force was the Heinkel 111 bombers of Kampfgeschwader 26. Geisler's Division was allocated the new Junkers Ju 88 bombers which were still being brought into service with Kampfgeschwader 25, on 7 September this was redesignated Kampfgeschwader 30.

The Corps was stationed in north Germany in February 1940 when some of its aircraft were involved in a disastrous friendly fire incident that terminated the Kriegsmarine's Operation Wikinger.

In early 1941, X. Fliegerkorps was transferred from Norway to Sicily to support the build-up of the Afrika Korps in Libya. On 12 January 1941, it had 80 Ju 88A-4 bombers of LG 1 and 12 Ju 88D-5 reconnaissance planes at Catania, 80 Ju 87R-1 ("Stuka") dive-bombers of StG 1 and StG 2 at Trapani, 27 He 111H-6 torpedo bombers of KG 26 at Comiso and 34 Bf 110C-4 fighters of ZG 26 at Palermo.  It was prominent in the axis effort to suppress Royal Navy interference with the supply routes from Italy by reducing Malta's effectiveness as a forward base.  On 10 and 11 January 1941 X. Fliegerkorps planes sank  and heavily damaged  during Operation Excess.  Bf 109E-7 fighters of JG 26 and JG 27 joined the offensive on Malta during February and March 1941.

The Corps was moved out of Sicily in April 1941 for the Invasion of Yugoslavia and Greece.  Maritime float planes replaced fighters and dive bombers while the Corps was stationed in Greece.  Strength on 10 May 1942 was 74 Ju 88 at Eleusis and Heraklion, 25 He 111 at Kalamaki, and 53 Ar 196A-3, He 60c, Fokker T.VIII and Bv 138C-1 at Skaramagas and Kavalla.  The Corps was crucial in securing air superiority and German victory during the 1943 Dodecanese Campaign. The Corps was renamed to Kommandierender General der Deutschen Luftwaffe in Griechenland (commanding general of the German Luftwaffe in Greece) in March 1944 and disbanded on 5 September 1944 with the withdrawal of German forces from the country.

Commanding officers

Commanding general
 General der Flieger Hans Geisler, 2 October 1939 – 31 August 1942
 General der Flieger Bernhard Kühl (acting), 3 June 1940 – 20 September 1940
 General der Flieger Otto Hoffmann von Waldau, 31 August 1942 – 31 December 1942
 Generalleutnant Alexander Holle, 1 January 1943 – 22 May 1943
 General der Flieger Martin Fiebig, 22 May 1943 – 1 September 1944

Chief-of-Staff
 Oberstleutnant Martin Harlinghausen, 1 November 1939 – 31.3.41
 Generalleutnant Ulrich Kessler (acting), 25 April 1940 – 21 May 1940
 Generalleutnant Günther Korten, 1 April 1941 – March 1942
 Oberst Sigismund Freiherr von Falkenhausen, 1 April 1942 - March 1943
 Major Eckard Christian, 8 March 1943 – 2 June 1943
 Generalmajor Walter Boenicke, June 1943 – 6 January 1944

References
Notes

References

 X. Fliegerkorps @ Lexikon der Wehrmacht
 X. Fliegerkorps @ The Luftwaffe, 1933-45

A010
Military units and formations established in 1939
1939 establishments in Germany
Military units and formations disestablished in 1944